Chiangiodendron is a genus of flowering plants belonging to the family Achariaceae.

Its native range is Mexico to Central America.

Species:
 Chiangiodendron mexicanum Wendt

References

Achariaceae
Malpighiales genera